Juan Pablo Vaulet, or simply Juan Vaulet (born March 22, 1996) is an Argentine professional basketball player for Baxi Manresa of the Spanish Liga ACB. Manu Ginobili's brother, Sebastián, coached Vaulet while he was with Bahía Basket in 2014–15.

Professional career
As a junior, Vaulet played for such clubs as Parque Vélez Sarsfield, Unión Eléctrica, General Paz Juniors and Hindú Club.

In 2014, Vaulet began his professional career, signing with Weber Bahía Estudiantes of the Liga Nacional de Básquet. He averaged 7.2 points and 4.1 rebounds in 34 games in his rookie season.

On July 18, 2019, Vaulet signed a two-year with Spanish club Baxi Manresa. 

On July 6, 2021, it was announced that Vaulet would be joining Greek club AEK Athens of the Basketball Champions League after the Tokyo Olympic Games basketball tournament. On August 21, 2021, the transfer officially materialized in a two-year deal. His contract with AEK Athens was mutually terminated on December 20, 2021.

On December 21, 2021, he has signed with Baxi Manresa of the Spanish Liga ACB.

NBA rights
Vaulet entered the 2015 NBA draft as its youngest international early entrant to remain eligible on draft day. On June 25, 2015, he was drafted with the 39th overall pick by the Charlotte Hornets, who later traded his draft rights to the Brooklyn Nets in exchange for two future second-round picks and cash considerations.

On October 6, 2021, Vaulet's draft rights were traded to the Indiana Pacers in exchange for Edmond Sumner and a 2025 second-round pick.
On February 9, 2023, his rights were returned to the Brooklyn Nets as part of the multi-team trade featuring Kevin Durant.

National team career
Vaulet has been a starter for the Argentina national team at multiple junior FIBA competitions.

In 2022, Vaulet won the gold medal with the senior team in the 2022 FIBA AmeriCup held in Recife, Brazil. He was one of Argentina´s small forwards in the tournament.

References

External links 
 Juan Pablo Vaulet at acb.com 
 USBasket.com profile
 Juan Pablo Vaulet at RealGM

1996 births
Living people
Argentine expatriate basketball people in Spain
Argentine men's basketball players
Basketball players at the 2020 Summer Olympics
Bàsquet Manresa players
Charlotte Hornets draft picks
Competitors at the 2019 Summer Universiade
Liga ACB players
Olympic basketball players of Argentina
Small forwards
Sportspeople from Córdoba, Argentina